Yehuda Gerami is the Chief Rabbi of Iran and spiritual leader for the Jewish community of Iran since 2011.

Early life 
Gerami was born in Tehran. His father Shlomo Gerami was a surgeon in many hospitals in Tehran including Dr. Sapir Jewish hospital. He went to Talmud Torah. At the age of 15 he went from Turkey to Jerusalem to study in Yeshivas Ateres Yisrael, under Rav Boruch Mordechai Ezrachi. He then came back to Iran for a year and then continued his Jewish studies in Yeshivas Ner Israel in Baltimore, Maryland which has a government-sanctioned arrangement with Iran. He continued his studies in United States until he got his rabbinical ordination under Rav Moshe Heinemann at the age of 25. He then returned to Iran and served as Chief Rabbi. Under this position he oversees Jewish community and supervises synagogues, mikvehs and kosher slaughter. 
In 2021, Gerami took part in the Alliance of Rabbis in Islamic States' first summit in Istanbul, Turkey.

In November 2021 Gerami visited Jewish communities in the United States and met with many Jewish organizations such as Chabad Lubavitch. He was criticized by many American Jewish leaders for his public denunciation of state of Israel and Zionism, and his visit to Qasem Soleimani's house in the aftermath of Soleimani's assassination by US forces.

External links

See also
 Younes Hamami Lalehzar
 Tehran Jewish Committee

References

Chief rabbis of Iran
Mizrahi Jews
21st-century rabbis
People from Tehran
Date of birth missing (living people)
Living people
1983 births